Gastrocotylinae is a sub-family of polyopisthocotylean monogeneans. All the species in this family are parasitic on fish.

Genera
According to the Lebedev (1986)  the sub-family includes 17 valid genera:
Allogastrocotyle Nasir & Fuentes Zambrano, 1984 
Amphipolycotyle Hargis, 1957 
Areotestis Yamaguti, 1965  
Churavera Unnithan, 1968 
Cypselurobranchitrema Yamaguti, 1966
Engraulicola George, 1960 
Engrauliphila  Unnithan, 1967 
Engrauliscobina Unnithan, 1967 
Engraulixenus Unnithan, 1967 
Eyelavera Unnithan, 1968 
Gastrocotyle Beneden & Hesse, 1863 
Irinaxine Ghichenok, 1980 
Pellonicola Unnithan, 1967  
Pseudaxine Parona & Perugia, 1890 
Pseudaxinoides Lebedev, 1968 
Quadrivalvula Ghichenok, 1980 
Sibitrema  Yamaguti, 1966

References

Polyopisthocotylea
Platyhelminthes families
Gastrocotylidae